2,1,3-Benzothiadiazole is a bicyclic molecule composed of a benzene ring that is fused to a 1,2,5-thiadiazole.

Preparation and structure 
2,1,3-Benzothiadiazole has been known since the 19th century. It is readily prepared in at least 85% yield from o-phenylenediamine by reaction with two equivalents of thionyl chloride in pyridine. The by-products are sulfur dioxide and HCl.

There are a number of alternative methods used to make this heterocycle and these have been reviewed. The crystal structure of the compound was determined in 1951, when it had the common name piazthiol(e).

Reactions 
The extent of the aromaticity of the compound was examined by a study of its proton NMR spectrum and comparison with naphthalene, which allowed the conclusion that it and related oxygen and selenium heterocycles did behave as 10-electron systems in which the 2-heteroatom contributed its lone pair to the ring current, in accordance with Hückel's rule.

As a result, 2,1,3-benzothiadiazole undergoes the standard chemistry of aromatic compounds, for example readily forming nitro and chloro derivatives. The chemistry of this heterocycle and its simple derivatives has been reviewed.

Under reducing conditions, 2,1,3-benzothiadiazoles can be converted back to the 1,2-diaminobenzene compounds from which they were prepared. This can be a useful way to protect a pair of reactive amino groups while other transformations are performed in the benzene ring to which they are attached.

Applications
2,1,3-Benzothiadiazole has been of interest as a redox-active organic component in flow batteries owing to its favourable solubility, low reduction potential and fast electrochemical kinetics.

Such properties in derivatives containing this heterocycle have made it of growing interest in dyestuffs, white light-emitting polymers, solar cells, and in luminescence studies.

References 

Benzothiadiazoles